Rohit Kumar Paudel (born 2 September 2002) is a Nepalese cricketer and current captain of the Nepal national cricket team. He made his List A debut for Nepal in the 2018 ICC World Cricket League Division Two tournament on 8 February 2018. He was inspired to play cricket, after Nepal played in the ICC T20 World Cup in Bangladesh. In January 2019, he became the youngest male cricketer to score an international half-century. The record was broken in February 2020, by his team-mate Kushal Malla. He is also all time highest run scorer of Nepal in ODI format and First Nepalese player to score 1000 runs in ODI cricket.Rohit Paudel was named captain of the Nepali National Cricket Team on November 12th, 2022.

International career
In July 2018, he was named in Nepal's squad for their One Day International (ODI) series against the Netherlands. These were Nepal's first ODI matches since gaining ODI status during the 2018 Cricket World Cup Qualifier. He made his Twenty20 debut for Nepal in the 2018 MCC Tri-Nation Series against the Marylebone Cricket Club on 29 July 2018. He made his ODI debut for Nepal against the Netherlands on 3 August 2018. At the age of 15 years and 335 days, he became the fourth-youngest player to make his debut in an ODI.

In August 2018, he was named in Nepal's squad for the 2018 Asia Cup Qualifier tournament. In October 2018, he was the leading run-scorer for Nepal in the 2018 ACC Under-19 Asia Cup, with 161 runs in three matches.

On 26 January 2019, at the age of 16 years and 146 days, Kumar became the youngest male cricketer to score an international half-century. He scored 55 runs from 58 balls in the second ODI against the United Arab Emirates at the ICC Academy Ground in Dubai.

In January 2019, he was named in Nepal's Twenty20 International (T20I) squad for their series against the United Arab Emirates. He made his T20I debut for Nepal against the United Arab Emirates on 31 January 2019. In April 2019, he was named as the captain of Nepal's squad for the Asia qualification tournament for the 2020 Under-19 Cricket World Cup. In Nepal's opening match of the tournament, against Singapore, Paudel scored 95 runs from 105 balls.

In June 2019, he was named in Nepal's squad for the Regional Finals of the 2018–19 ICC T20 World Cup Asia Qualifier tournament. In November 2019, he was named in Nepal's squad for the 2019 ACC Emerging Teams Asia Cup in Bangladesh. Later the same month, he was also named in Nepal's squad for the men's cricket tournament at the 2019 South Asian Games. The Nepal team won the bronze medal, after they beat the Maldives by five wickets in the third-place playoff match. In September 2020, he was one of eighteen cricketers to be awarded with a central contract by the Cricket Association of Nepal.

On 25 March 2022, in the first match of a two-match series against Papua New Guinea, Paudel scored his first century in an ODI match with 126 runs.

References

External links
 

2002 births
Living people
Nepalese cricketers
Nepal One Day International cricketers
Nepal Twenty20 International cricketers
People from Nawalpur District
South Asian Games bronze medalists for Nepal
South Asian Games medalists in cricket